Perth Prison may refer to:

 HM Prison Perth, Scotland
 Perth Gaol, or Old Perth Gaol, Australia

See also
 Perth Immigration Detention Centre, Australia